Yahya Goba is a Yemeni-American who grew up in the suburbs of Buffalo, New York. In 2002, he was arrested and charged as part of the War on Terror together with the other members of the "Lackawanna Six", based on the fact that he and a group of friends had attended an Afghan training camp together years earlier.

Life
When Kamal Derwish moved back to Lackawanna in 2000, he lived with his uncle until Goba volunteered to split an apartment with him. Derwish then began holding regular get-togethers at the apartment, where a group of upwards to 25 young Muslim men would get together to discuss religion and eat pizza. Goba and Jaber Elbaneh tended to "compete" for the attention and favour of Derwish, who spoke of his travels abroad and ostensible history fighting in Palestine. He applied for a new passport, noting that his old one had been destroyed after being thrown in the washing machine in a shirt pocket. Authorities believe and have averred that he was trying to erase incriminating visa stamps marking his overseas visits.

References

American people imprisoned on charges of terrorism
American people of Yemeni descent
Buffalo Six
Living people
People from Lackawanna, New York
Year of birth missing (living people)